The Y-Block was a building in Oslo, Norway, extant from 1970 to 2020. It featured two murals by Pablo Picasso.

The building was damaged during the 2011 Norway attacks. In 2020, following intense public debate, the building's murals were removed and the remaining structure was demolished. The murals are planned to be incorporated into a replacement building.

Gallery

Demolition

References

External links
 

Buildings and structures in Oslo
Office buildings in Norway
2011 Norway attacks
Brutalist architecture
Government buildings in Norway
Government buildings completed in 1970
Demolished buildings and structures in Norway
Buildings and structures demolished in 2020